How to Destroy Angels is the debut extended play by post-industrial group How to Destroy Angels. The six-song EP was released as a free download via the band's website on June 1, 2010, and a retail CD was released on July 6, 2010. A "Hi-Def Upgrade" was also available, with higher quality audio and the music video for the song "The Space in Between", while "A Drowning" was officially released as a single. 
 
As with many of Trent Reznor's official releases, it was designated with a unique name and number: "SIGIL 02".

The EP was included as bonus tracks on the iTunes release of their debut album, Welcome Oblivion.

Artwork
The artwork for the release was created by Mark Weaver, under art direction by Rob Sheridan. Sheridan stated that the choice for Weaver was to make the release as visually distinct as possible from Nine Inch Nails.

For unexplained reasons, the physical and digital EP both came with different artwork.

Promotion
 The song "Fur Lined" was used in episode 7 ("Clawback") of the second season of television show Nikita. 
 "The Believers" was used in the 2011 film Limitless and was featured on the soundtrack.
 "The Space in Between" was featured in the promo for the TV series Hannibal.

Track listing

Album personnel
Written, arranged, produced, performed and art directed by How to Destroy Angels. 
Mariqueen Maandig
Trent Reznor
Atticus Ross
Rob Sheridan
Mixed by Alan Moulder
Engineering: Blumpy
Mastering: Tom Baker

References

Albums free for download by copyright owner
2010 EPs
The Null Corporation EPs
How to Destroy Angels (band) EPs